Le Grau-du-Roi is a railway station in Le Grau-du-Roi, Occitanie, southern France. Within TER Occitanie, it is part of line 26 (Nîmes-Le Grau-du-Roi).

References

Railway stations in Gard
Le Grau-du-Roi